Bouchercon is an annual convention of creators and devotees of mystery and detective fiction. It is named in honour of writer, reviewer, and editor Anthony Boucher; also the inspiration for the Anthony Awards, which have been issued at the convention since 1986. This article details Bouchercon XX and the 4th Anthony Awards ceremony.

Bouchercon
The convention was held in Philadelphia, Pennsylvania, on October 6, 1989; running until the 8th. The event was chaired by Deen Kogan and Jay Kogan, founders of the Society Hill playhouse.

Special guests
Lifetime Achievement award — Dorothy Salisbury Davis
Guest of Honor — Simon Brett
Fan Guests of Honor — William F. Deeck and Linda Toole
Toastmaster — Bruce Taylor
Distinguished Contribution award — Joan Kahn

Anthony Awards
The following list details the awards distributed at the fourth annual Anthony Awards ceremony.

Novel award
Winner:
Thomas Harris, The Silence of the Lambs

Shortlist:
Dorothy Cannell, The Widows Club
Sue Grafton, "E" Is for Evidence
Tony Hillerman, A Thief of Time
Sara Paretsky, Blood Shot
Nancy Picard, Dead Crazy
Bill Pronzini, Shackles
Les Roberts, Pepper Pike

First novel award
Winner:
Elizabeth George, A Great Deliverance

Shortlist:
Mary Lou Bennett, Murder Once Done
Caroline Graham, The Killings at Badger's Drift
Linda Grant, Random Access Murder
Gar Anthony Haywood, Fear of the Dark
David Stout, Carolina Skeletons

Paperback original award
Winner:
Carolyn G. Hart, Something Wicked

Shortlist:
Michael Avallone, High Noon at Midnight
P.M. Carlson, Murder Unrenovated
David Handler, The Man Who Died Laughing
Lia Matera, A Radical Departure
Sharyn McCrumb, Paying the Piper
D.R. Meredith, Murder by Impulse
Marilyn Wallace, Primary Target

References

Anthony Awards
20
1989 in Pennsylvania